Paul Harrington is the name of:

Paul Harrington (musician) (born 1960), Irish musician and Eurovision Song Contest winner
Paul Randall Harrington (1911–1980), American orthopaedic surgeon and designer of the Harrington Rod